Mingori is a surname of Italian origin. Notable people with the surname include:

 D. Lewis Mingori (born 1938), American scientist
 Steve Mingori (1944–2008), American baseball player

See also
Mingori Robinetterie, French manufacturer of plumbing fixtures

Surnames of Italian origin